Camille Gira (2 June 1958 – 16 May 2018) was a Luxembourgish politician for the Greens.  Born in Luxembourg City, he was a member of the national legislature, the Chamber of Deputies, representing the Nord constituency since the 1994 election.

He was mayor of Beckerich, first elected on 11 May 1990.  Prior to that, he had been an échevin in the commune (1982–1990).

He was an air traffic controller at Luxembourg-Findel International Airport between 1977 and his election to the Chamber in 1994.

Gira collapsed while delivering a speech in parliament on 16 May 2018. He was rushed to hospital but died later that day from heart failure.

Footnotes

External links
  Chamber of Deputies official biography

1958 births
2018 deaths
People from Luxembourg City
The Greens (Luxembourg) politicians
Mayors of places in Luxembourg
Members of the Chamber of Deputies (Luxembourg)
Members of the Chamber of Deputies (Luxembourg) from Nord
Councillors in Beckerich
Air traffic controllers